Bambar is a river flowing in the Sivagangai district of the Indian state of Tamil Nadu.

References

See also 
List of rivers of Tamil Nadu

Rivers of Tamil Nadu
Sivaganga district
Rivers of India

ta:பாம்பாறு (ஆறு)